This is a list of fictional princes that have appeared in various works of fiction. It is organized by medium and limited to well-referenced, notable examples of the fictional princes.

Literature 
This section contains examples of both classic and more modern writing.

Comics

Theatre

Film

Live action

Animation

Disney

Other

Television

Live action

Animation

Radio

Video games

See also 
 List of fictional princesses
 List of fictional monarchs (fictional countries)
 List of fictional nobility

References

External links 

 
Fictional princes
princes
princes